is a Japanese historical romance manga series written and illustrated by Kaoru Mori. The story follows the daily lives of several young women and their respective fiancés and husbands during the Russian conquest of Central Asia in the late 19th century. A Bride's Story was first serialized in Enterbrain's  manga magazine Harta (formerly known as Fellows!) from 14 October 2008 to 13 November 2020. It transferred to Kadokawa's manga magazine  on 18 June 2021. The series' chapters have been collected into fourteen  volumes by Kadokawa as of 20 October 2022. The first nine volumes were published under Enterbrain's Beam Comix imprint; subsequent volumes have been published under Kadokawa's Harta Comix imprint. In addition to the  release, a wide-ban collector's edition of the manga has been issued by Kadokawa since 20 August 2021. The wide-ban features large pages, high-quality paper, fold-out color illustrations, and special boxes to store each volume in. A Bride's Story is also available in digital e-book format in Japan.

Yen Press licensed the series for an English-language release in North America. The first volume was published on 31 May 2011; the thirteenth and most recent volume was published on 19 April 2022. The series received a digital release in English starting on 25 September 2018. A Bride's Story is also licensed for regional language releases by Ki-oon in France, Tokyopop Germany in Germany, J-Pop Manga in Italy, Norma Editorial in Spain, Studio JG in Poland, Punainen jättiläinen in Finland, Level Comics in Indonesia, Daewon C.I. in Korea, Kadokawa Taiwan in Taiwan, Siam Inter Comics in Thailand, and IPM in Vietnam.

Volume list

Chapters not yet in tankōbon format
The following chapters have yet to be published in a  volume:

References

External links

Bride's Story, A